The Gooch Close Gang also known as the G.C.O.G's (Gooch Close Original Gangsters) or simply “The Gooch” in Manchester, is an organised crime group based in Moss Side and surrounding neighbourhoods of south Manchester, England. Most members of the gang grew up on the westside of the Alexandra Park estate in Moss Side around Gooch Close (which is where the gang gets its name).

The Gooch is part of an alliance of Crip gangs, and has had violent disputes with many other South Manchester gangs, most notably The Doddington Gang (formerly known as the Pepperhill Mob), The Moss Side Bloods and The Longsight Crew.

History 
The Gooch Gang has its origins in the westside of the Alexandra Park estate in Moss Side. Young men would hang around a Shebeen on Gooch Close selling drugs which is where the gang started and how they got their name. Gooch Close was a small cul-de-sac of semi-detached houses with an alley at one end. In the mid 1990s the Alexandra Park estate was redeveloped and the street was redesigned and had its name changed to Westerling Way.

The gangs - whilst supplying to the street dealers - also tried to ensure that the dealers were protected from other gangs by protecting their territory. Most of their problems occurred when rival street dealers started to move into territory already controlled by a gang or when a gang 'taxed' a rival dealer - a move seen as damaging street credibility and respect.

The gangs in south Manchester, including the Gooch gang, were made up of mostly first and second generation British West Indies Caribbean heritage members, whose grandparents came to England from the 1950s.

Around the same time as the Gooch Close gang was becoming known around the city, the Pepperhill Gang were also starting to emerge - taking their name from a pub on the eastside of the Alexandra Park estate. When the pub was closed down and the gang targeted by police, they reformed around nearby Doddington Close and would go on to become known as the Doddington Gang. 

In the late 1980s and early 1990s, the Pepperhill gang were involved in a gang war between Moss Side and the Cheetham Hill Gang from North Manchester. The Gooch often bought and sold drugs with the Cheetham Hill Gang. The Gooch had close ties to Cheetham Hill, with the cousin of the Cheetham Hill Head being a leading figure in the Gooch. The Pepperhill gang thought this was helping the "enemy". The Pepperhill gang declared that nobody from South Manchester was to have dealings with Cheetham Hill. This angered the Gooch and a fierce war erupted, dividing the Alexandra Park estate in half, with the Gooch on the westside and the Pepperhill on the eastside. Although the gang war was centred around Moss Side, young males from neighbouring areas would be drawn into the conflict resulting in a number of deaths and regular shooting incidents in South Manchester throughout the 1990s and 2000s.[7]

In 1996, an offshoot gang was identified (Young Gooch) which gained a frightening reputation for the violence and guns its members used. Five of its members were later arrested following Operation Eagle and were sentenced to more than 43 years in prison. The Young Gooch started to war with the newly emerging Longsight Crew, a younger offshoot of the Doddington gang whose members were based on a number of estates in the Longsight and Ardwick areas of south Manchester, especially their headquarters of Langport Avenue.

By the mid 2000s the Gooch had grown to become a vast gang made up of a number of smaller offshoot crews based around south Manchester. The most notable of these being the Longsight Street Soldiers, Old Trafford Crips, Rusholme Crips and Fallowfield Mad Dogs. These gangs would carry on the rivalry with Doddington and Longsight Crew into the 2000s.

Imprisonment 
Ten members of south Manchester's Gooch gang were put on trial in October 2008 for a catalogue of gang-related crimes. Gang members Colin Joyce and Lee Amos had been arrested in 2000, when they had been apprehended at their 'nerve centre' in a house in Moss Side, found with an 'extraordinary array of firearms'. In 2001, they had been sentenced to nine years in prison but had been released early, on licence, in 2007 and there had followed a new bout of shootings.

In April 2009, Joyce and Amos were among 11 members of the 'Gooch gang' who were found guilty and charged with a 'catalogue of crimes' which included the murder of Ucal Chin and Tyrone Gilbert. These convictions were hailed by Manchester's chief prosecutor John Holt as having 'enormous significance for public safety'. Their trials were held 35 miles away at Liverpool Crown Court to lower the risk of witness intimidation from other gang members. Not unusually, the perpetrators of gun crime were also the victims, with Amos's brother Stephen Baba-Tunde Amos having been shot dead, in a gang-related shooting, aged 21, outside a bar in Ashton-under-Lyne in 2002.

Colin Joyce, aged 29, known as the leader of the gang, was given a minimum 39-year sentence. Lee Amos was sentenced to receive at least 35 years. Three other members of the gang were given minimum sentences of between 30 and 35 years.

References 

Organizations established in the 1980s
1980s establishments in England
Organised crime groups in England
Gangs in Manchester